Adavalle Aligithe is a 1983 Indian Telugu-language comedy film produced by Akkineni Srinivasa Rao and Yarramshetty Anjineeyulu and directed by Vejella Satyanarayana. It stars Gummadi, Nutan Prasad, Rajendra Prasad, Ranganath, Sai Chand, Devika and Rajyalakshmi, with music composed by Krishna-Chakra.

Plot
The entire film runs around a joint family, Subbarayudu (Gummadi) is the head of the family and his wife is Venkatalakshmi (Devika). He has 4 brothers, Ganapathi (Nutan Prasad), Prasad (Ranganath), Karthik (Rajendra Prasad), Paaru (Sai Chand) and their wives Rajeswari (P. R. Varalakshmi), Sharada (Vejella Rajeswari), Anasuya (Rajyalakshmi) & Jaya (Vanitha Sri) respectively. All of them live very happily, but the only problem is, the men ignore their wives and look them at a low profile. According to them, wives must be kept under control for a happy family. Here the ladies show resent through sulk by playing a drama to change their husbands' perception with the intention of creating a happy and affectionate family in which everyone respects each other. Rest of the story is how the wives execute their plan and succeed?

Cast
Gummadi as Subbarayudu
Nutan Prasad as Ganapathi
Rajendra Prasad as Karthik
Ranganath as Prasad
Sai Chand as Paaru
Suthi Velu as Vemana
Potti Prasad
C.H.Krishna Murthy as Yadagiri
Chitti Babu as Damodaram
Devika as Venkatalakshmi
Rajyalakshmi as Anasuya
P.R.Varalakshmi as Rajeswari
Veejella Rajeswari as Sharada
Vanitha Sri as Jaya
Kalpana Rai as Vemana's wife

Soundtrack

Music composed by Krishna-Chakra. Lyrics were written by Dr. Nellutla. Music released on AVM Audio Company.

Other
 VCDs and DVDs on - Moser Baer Home Videos, Hyderabad

References

External links
 

1980s Telugu-language films